Grevillea polychroma , commonly known as Tullach Ard grevillea, is a species of flowering plant in the family Proteaceae and is endemic to eastern Victoria. It is a spreading to erect shrub with densely hairy branchlets, egg-shaped leaves, the narrower end towards the base, and down-turned clusters of hairy, cream-coloured, pale yellow or pink to red flowers.

Description
The upper surface of the leaves is glossy and glabrous, the lower surface densely hairy.

Taxonomy
This grevillea was first formally described in 2000 by Bill Molyneux and Val Stajsic, who gave it the name Grevillea brevifolia subsp. polychroma in the Flora of Australia.<ref name=APNI1>{{cite web|title=Grevillea brevifolia subsp. polychroma''''|url= https://id.biodiversity.org.au/instance/apni/8096863|publisher=APNI|access-date=28 August 2022}}</ref> In 2006, the same authors raised the subspecies to species status as Grevillea polychroma in the journal Muelleria.<ref name=APNI>{{cite web|title=Grevillea polychroma''|url= https://id.biodiversity.org.au/instance/apni/603604|publisher=APNI|access-date=28 August 2022}}</ref> The specific epithet (polychroma) means "many colours", referring to the variable flower colour of this species.

Conservation status
The species is listed as "endangered" under the Victorian Government Flora and Fauna Guarantee Act 1988 and as "Rare in Victoria" on the Department of Sustainability and Environment's Advisory List of Rare or Threatened Plants in Victoria''.

References

polychroma
Flora of Victoria (Australia)
Proteales of Australia
Plants described in 2000